John Richard Chambers  (March 25, 1931 – April 13, 1978) was an artist and filmmaker. Born in London, Ontario, Chambers' painting style shifted from surrealist-influenced to photo-realist-influenced. He used the term "Perceptual Realism" and later "perceptualism" to describe his style. He began working with film in the 1960s, completing six by 1970. Stan Brakhage proclaimed Chambers' The Hart of London as "one of the greatest films ever made."

Biography
Born John Richard Chambers in London, Ontario, Chambers signed his name as John until 1970 and thereafter was known as Jack professionally and posthumously. Chambers spent eight years (1953–1961) studying and working in Europe after studying at H.B. Beal Secondary School and the University of Western Ontario. While in Europe he met Pablo Picasso, who suggested he continue his studies in Barcelona. He called his own work "perceptual realism," a kind of surrealism based on his own dreams and memories and the existentialist philosophy of Maurice Merleau-Ponty. When he returned to London, Chambers worked with fellow London native Greg Curnoe. In 1969 he was diagnosed with leukemia. For the rest of his life he painted more realistically, often depicting sites in London and the surrounding area. An example of this is 401 Towards London No. 1 (1968–1969), a view of Highway 401 heading westward towards London.

In 1968, he founded Canadian Artists' Representation (CARFAC), now a national organization of artists, after an argument with the National Gallery of Canada over reproduction rights and fees. In 1973 he received the Victor Martyn Lynch-Staunton Award.

His work is in the collections of the National Gallery of Canada, the Art Gallery of Ontario, and Museum London. An elementary school Jack Chambers Public School (and the streets surrounding it) are named for him in London, and a tree was planted in his memory in Gibbons Park after his death.

The 2012 retrospective of his work at the Art Gallery of Ontario has helped introduce his oeuvre to a new audience.

Perceptual Realism
Chambers evolved his theory of Perceptual Realism in the late 1960s in an essay of the same name. He argued for different types of realism and believed that his approach was unique. Art historian Mark Cheetham calls it "a fully articulated position that detailed art’s profound and spiritual relationship with primary sensory experience" and applies to his most notable films and paintings. Perceptual Realism showed the essence of matter through light and material. Chambers called it "a faculty of inner vision where the object appears in the splendour of its essential namelessness.

Paintings
The foundations of Chambers’ painting technique were laid during his training in Spain. Many of his paintings from that period show the influence of Surrealism. After his return to Canada in 1961 he experimented with paint application and vibrant colour. By the mid-1960s his style changed again as he worked a sense of temporal movement into his paintings. Forms were fragmented in these paintings: "A painting gets put together just like an experience – in particles." In the mid-1960s Chambers also produced his silver paintings using aluminum pigment. Other artists, including Andy Warhol, also experimented with this unusual metallic colour.

Films

Between 1964 and 1970, Chambers completed six films varying in length between nine minutes and 79 minutes. Working in both black and white and colour film, his works were montages dealing on the surface with his domestic life and images of London, Ontario. They were also examinations of the contrast between nature and society. Although for the most part peripheral to the history of avant-garde film, owing to his early death and reluctance to travel with his films for festivals, Chambers' filmography and in particular his feature-length film The Hart of London have become important within Canadian film history but have also grown in stature internationally.

Filmography

 Mosaic (1964–65, black and white, sound, 9 min.)
 Hybrid (1966, colour, silent, 15 min.)
 Little Red Riding Hood (with Greg Curnoe and James Reaney) (1967, colour, sound, 25 min.)
 R-34 (1967, colour, sound, 30 min.)
 Circle (1968–69, colour/black and white, sound, 28 min.)
 The Hart of London (1968–70, colour/black and white, sound, 79 min.)
 C.C.C.I. (unfinished) (c.1970)
 Life Still (unfinished) (c.1970)

Films About Jack Chambers

 Chambers (Fraser Boa, 1969, col., so., 41 min.)
 Jack Chambers (Cynthia Scott, CBC 'Man Alive' program, 1971, col., so., 52 min(?)
 Life Force (Peter Mellen, 1974, col., so., 26 min.)
 Chambers: Tracks and Gestures (Christopher Lowry and John Walker, 1982, col., so., 57 min.) (DVD Ecotone Productions)

References

Notes

Bibliography
 Brakhage, Stan. "The Hart of London: A Document of the City." The Films of Jack Chambers. Kathryn Elder, ed. Toronto: Cinematheque Ontario Monographs. 117-124. 
 Burnett, David G. Jack Chambers Retrospective. London, Ontario: Regional Art Gallery, 1988. 
 Chambers, Jack. "Perceptual Realism." The Films of Jack Chambers. Kathryn Elder, ed. Toronto: Cinematheque Ontario Monographs. 33-43. 
 Chambers, Jack. Jack Chambers: Selection of Paintings and Drawings. Ottawa: Canadian High Commission, 1978.
 Cheetham, Mark. Jack Chambers: Life & Work. Toronto: Art Canada Institute, 2013. E-Book.
 Elder, Kathryn. The Films of Jack Chambers. Toronto: Cinematheque Ontario Monograph, 2002.

External links
 Jack Chambers: Life & Work by Jack Chambers, free e-book
 The Films of Jack Chambers (copy archived November 23, 2005)
 Canadian Artists' Representation
 Canadian Film Encyclopedia
 The Canadian Encyclopedia

1931 births
1978 deaths
20th-century Canadian painters
Canadian male painters
Modern artists
Artists from London, Ontario
Film directors from London, Ontario
University of Western Ontario alumni
Canadian experimental filmmakers
20th-century Canadian male artists